The Fulton Street station is a major New York City Subway station complex in Lower Manhattan. It consists of four linked stations on the IND Eighth Avenue Line, the IRT Lexington Avenue Line, the BMT Nassau Street Line and the IRT Broadway–Seventh Avenue Line. The complex is served by the 2, 4, A, and J trains at all times. The 3, 5, and C trains stop here at all times except late nights, and the Z stops during rush hours in the peak direction.

The complex comprises four stations, all named Fulton Street. The Lexington Avenue Line station was built for the Interborough Rapid Transit Company (IRT) as part of the city's first subway line, and opened on January 16, 1905. The Broadway–Seventh Avenue Line station, built for the IRT as part of the Dual Contracts, opened on July 1, 1918. The Brooklyn–Manhattan Transit Corporation (BMT)'s Nassau Street Line station was also built under the Dual Contracts and opened on May 29, 1931. The Independent Subway System (IND)'s Eighth Avenue Line station was the final one in the complex to be completed, opening on February 1, 1933. Several modifications have been made to the stations over the years, and they were connected within a single fare control area in 1948. The station was renovated during the 2000s and early 2010s, becoming part of the Fulton Center complex, which opened in 2014.

The Lexington Avenue, Nassau Street, and Broadway–Seventh Avenue Line stations cross Fulton Street at Broadway, Nassau Street, and William Street respectively. The Eighth Avenue Line station is underneath Fulton Street, between Broadway and Nassau Streets. The Lexington Avenue and Nassau Street Line stations each have two tracks and two side platforms, while the Broadway–Seventh Avenue and Eighth Avenue Line stations each have two tracks and one island platform. The complex is connected to the nearby Chambers Street–World Trade Center/Park Place/Cortlandt Street station complex and the World Trade Center Transportation Hub through the out-of-system Dey Street Passageway. The station was the fifth busiest in the system in 2019, with 27,715,365 passengers.



History

Construction and opening

First subway 
Planning for a subway line in New York City dates to 1864. However, development of what would become the city's first subway line did not start until 1894, when the New York State Legislature authorized the Rapid Transit Act. The subway plans were drawn up by a team of engineers led by William Barclay Parsons, chief engineer of the Rapid Transit Commission. The Rapid Transit Construction Company, organized by John B. McDonald and funded by August Belmont Jr., signed the initial Contract 1 with the Rapid Transit Commission in February 1900, in which it would construct the subway and maintain a 50-year operating lease from the opening of the line. In 1901, the firm of Heins & LaFarge was hired to design the underground stations. Belmont incorporated the Interborough Rapid Transit Company (IRT) in April 1902 to operate the subway.

Several days after Contract 1 was signed, the Board of Rapid Transit Railroad Commissioners instructed Parsons to evaluate the feasibility of extending the subway south to South Ferry, and then to Brooklyn. On January 24, 1901, the Board adopted a route that would extend the subway from City Hall to the Long Island Rail Road (LIRR)'s Flatbush Avenue terminal station (now known as Atlantic Terminal) in Brooklyn, via the Joralemon Street Tunnel under the East River. Contract 2, giving a lease of 35 years, was executed between the commission and the Rapid Transit Construction Company on September 11, 1902. Construction began at State Street in Manhattan on November 8, 1902. The section of the Contract 2 subway tunnel under the southernmost section of Broadway, between Battery Park and City Hall, was contracted to Degnon-McLean Contracting Company.

The IRT Lexington Avenue Line station opened on January 16, 1905, as part of a one-stop extension southbound from Brooklyn Bridge–City Hall, the previous southernmost express station on the original IRT line. Only the northbound platform was in use when service started at this station. The southbound platform opened for service on June 12, 1905, when the subway was extended one stop to the south at Wall Street.

To address overcrowding, in 1909, the New York Public Service Commission proposed lengthening platforms at stations along the original IRT subway. As part of a modification to the IRT's construction contracts, made on January 18, 1910, the company was to lengthen station platforms  to accommodate ten-car express and six-car local trains. In addition to $1.5 million (equivalent to $ million in ) spent on platform lengthening, $500,000 was spent on building additional entrances and exits. It was anticipated that these improvements would increase capacity by 25 percent. The northbound platform at the Fulton Street station was extended  to the south, while the southbound platform was extended  to the south. The northbound platform extension required underpinning adjacent buildings, while the southbound platform extension was largely in the basements of adjacent properties and involved extensive reconstruction. On January 23, 1911, ten-car express trains began running on the East Side Line, and the next day, ten-car express trains began running on the West Side Line. Staircases from the southbound platform to 195 Broadway, at the northwest corner of Broadway and Dey Street, opened in 1916.

Subsequent lines 
After the original IRT opened, the city began planning new lines. In 1913, as part of the Dual Contracts, the New York City Public Service Commission planned to split the original IRT system into three segments: two north-south lines, carrying through trains over the Lexington Avenue and Broadway–Seventh Avenue Lines, and a west-east shuttle under 42nd Street. This would form a roughly "H"-shaped system. The IRT Broadway–Seventh Avenue Line platform was built on the portion of that line south of Times Square–42nd Street. The line first opened as a shuttle to 34th Street–Penn Station on June 3, 1917. The line was extended south to South Ferry on July 1, 1918; the Fulton Street station opened on the same date, and was served by a shuttle between Chambers Street and Wall Street, on the line's Brooklyn Branch. On August 1, 1918, the new "H" system was implemented, joining the two halves of the Broadway–Seventh Avenue Line and sending all West Side trains south from Times Square. The Lexington Avenue Line also opened north of Grand Central–42nd Street, and all services at the Lexington Avenue Line station were sent through that line. As a result, shuttle service to the Broadway–Seventh Avenue Line station was replaced by through service.

Also as part of the Dual Contracts, the Brooklyn–Manhattan Transit Corporation (BMT) was assigned to construct and operate the Nassau Street Line. The portion of the line passing through the current Nassau Street station did not start until the mid-1920s. Contracts for the project were awarded, with the portion north of Liberty Street awarded to Marcus Contracting Company and the portion south of Liberty Street awarded to Moranti and Raymond. Work was projected to be completed in 39 months, and in March 1929, sixty percent of the work had been finished. The Nassau Street Loop opened on May 29, 1931. The line was extended two stops from its previous terminus at Chambers Street through the Fulton Street and Broad Street stations and to a connection to the Montague Street Tunnel, which allowed trains to run to Brooklyn.

The Independent Subway System (IND), which was not part of the Dual Contracts, commenced construction on its Eighth Avenue Line in 1925. The Broadway/Nassau Street station was part of a three-stop extension of the IND Eighth Avenue Line from Chambers Street in Lower Manhattan to Jay Street–Borough Hall in Downtown Brooklyn. Construction of the extension began in June 1928. The main section of the Eighth Avenue Line, from Chambers Street north to 207th Street, was opened to the public just after midnight on September 10, 1932. The Cranberry Street Tunnel, extending the express tracks east under Fulton Street to Jay Street, was opened for the morning rush hour on February 1, 1933, with a stop at Broadway/Nassau Street. The Broadway/Nassau station was initially served by express trains during the daytime on weekdays and Saturdays; local trains only served the station when express trains were not operating. It had ten entrances from the street, as well as direct connections to the IRT and BMT stations at Fulton Street. The opening of Broadway/Nassau station eliminated an "outstanding drawback" to Upper Manhattan residents' usage of the Eighth Avenue Line, as the IND previously did not have a direct connection to Manhattan's Financial District.

Station improvements

20th century
The city government took over the BMT's operations on June 1, 1940, and the IRT's operations on June 12, 1940. Transfer passageways between the four stations were placed inside fare control on July 1, 1948. The passageways between the Eighth Avenue, Nassau Street, and Broadway–Seventh Avenue platforms all existed at the time, and were simply placed inside fare control. However, a paper transfer was issued to passengers transferring to and from the Lexington Avenue Line. On August 25, 1950, the railings of the Lexington Avenue and Eighth Avenue Line stations were rearranged to allow direct transfers, and the paper transfers were discontinued.

In 1979, the New York City Landmarks Preservation Commission designated the space within the boundaries of the original IRT Lexington Avenue Line station, excluding expansions made after 1904, as a city landmark. The station was designated along with eleven others on the original IRT.

In 1982, the Urban Mass Transportation Administration gave a $66 million grant to the New York City Transit Authority. Part of the grant was to be used for the renovation of several subway stations, including Fulton Street's IRT platforms. In the 1990s, the BMT and IND platforms at the Fulton Street station were renovated. However, none of the IRT platforms had ever received a substantial renovation since their opening. In late 1996, as part of a pilot program to reduce overcrowding, the Metropolitan Transportation Authority painted orange boxes on the Lexington Avenue Line platforms, and it employed platform attendants during rush hours. Additionally, to reduce dwell times, the MTA started enforcing a policy that required conductors to close their doors after 45 seconds. This trial was shortly expanded to other stations.

Fulton Center
After several pieces of transit infrastructure in Lower Manhattan were destroyed or severely damaged during the September 11, 2001, attacks, officials proposed a $7 billion redesign of transit in the neighborhood. By April 2003, the MTA had released preliminary plans for a $750 million transit hub at Fulton Street, connecting six subway stations and constructing a new head house and the Dey Street Passageway. In December 2003, the Federal Transit Administration allocated the Fulton Street Transit Center (later the Fulton Center) $750 million. The transit center would be financed using money from the September 11 recovery fund. By May 2006, the budget had grown and the project had been delayed. Further delays and costs were incurred in February 2007. To remedy the overrun, the MTA downsized the original plans for the transit center. Subsequently, the MTA used 2009 federal stimulus money to help fund the project. In January 2009, the MTA received $497 million in additional stimulus money, bringing the total cost of the Fulton Street Transit Center to $1.4 billion.

The project rehabilitated two of the four stations in the Fulton Street station complex. The rehabilitation of the Seventh Avenue Line platform, started in 2005. This project was completed by November 2006. The  station at the western end of the complex was rehabilitated beginning in 2008. Historical features, such as the tiling, were preserved. The structure was joined by the Fulton Building on the northbound platform, and the Dey Street Headhouse on the southbound platform, when they opened.

An intricate system of ramps was replaced by two new mezzanines. Work on the IND mezzanine commenced in January 2010; the reconstruction of the transfer mezzanine over the Fulton Street IND platform resulted in traffic flow changes. The Eighth Avenue Line station adopted the "Fulton Street" name in December 2010 to become unified with the other platforms in the station complex. The eastern mezzanine and parts of the western mezzanine had opened by 2011, and the western mezzanine was completed by 2012. Additionally, new entrances were opened as part of the project. In October 2012, a new entrance on Dey Street opened for the Dey Street underpass to Cortlandt Street, and an ADA-accessible elevator was installed for the southbound Lexington Avenue Line platform. In November 2014, the Fulton Center project was completed, and the entire complex was made ADA-accessible.

Station layout

Originally, a network of passageways and ramps loosely connected the various lines with each other, causing congestion during peak hours. The transfer mezzanine, also known as the IND mezzanine, replaced these ramps and made several adjacent entrances redundant. 

Almost all transfers are made through the IND Eighth Avenue Line platform, which is three stories below ground level and runs below the other three stations. The stacked-staggered configuration of the BMT Nassau Street Line platforms splits the IND mezzanine levels into halves. The eastern half stretches from Nassau Street to William Street, from the southbound Nassau Street Line platform to the Broadway–Seventh Avenue Line platform. Similarly, the western half of the mezzanine stretches from Nassau Street to Broadway, from the northbound Nassau Street Line to the Lexington Avenue Line platforms. Transferring passengers have to use the third-basement-level IND platform to navigate between both halves of the mezzanine, since the Nassau Street Line's platforms bisect the mezzanine on both the first and second basement levels.

Exits 
Due to the highly fragmented nature of the Fulton Street station, most of its entrances are only signed as serving certain routes, even though all exits technically provide access to all routes. Prior to the completion of Fulton Center, many of the station's entrances had been constructed piecemeal within various buildings, and these entrances were not easily visible from the street. The entire station complex is ADA-accessible via a series of elevators between the platforms and mezzanines.

At Broadway and Fulton Street, two stairs go up to the northwestern corner and one goes to 195 Broadway near the southwestern corner. One stair each goes up to the northwestern corner of Broadway's intersections with Dey and Cortlandt Streets. Additionally, one entrance, a stair at the northeast corner of Maiden Lane and Broadway, is signed as serving the Eighth Avenue Line and northbound Lexington Avenue Line platforms.

Four Broadway entrances are signed as providing access to several routes in the complex. The Fulton Center building has stairs, escalators, and elevators, while the Corbin Building contains escalators.

At Fulton and William Streets are five entrances: two stairs to the northeastern corner, one to the southeastern corner, and one stair and one elevator to the southwestern corner. There are also two part-time entrances inside the office building at 110 William Street; one is on William Street and the other is on John Street.

Two stairs, one on either western corner of Nassau and Fulton Streets, serve the Eighth Avenue Line and northbound Nassau Street Line platforms. Four stairs, one each on either eastern corner of Nassau and Fulton Streets and on either eastern corner of John and Nassau Streets, serve the Eighth Avenue Line and northbound Nassau Street Line platforms. The John and Nassau Streets entrances are open only during rush hours. From the north end of the Nassau Street Line station, there is a sealed exit to Ann Street and passageway to Beekman Street and Pace University to the far north. This passageway was out of system and more than one block long.

IRT Broadway–Seventh Avenue Line platform 

The Fulton Street station on the IRT Broadway–Seventh Avenue Line has two tracks and one island platform. The 2 train stops here at all times, while the 3 train stops here at all times except late nights.

The platform is extremely narrow, causing congestion during rush hours. The station has two mezzanines, separated at Fulton Street. The full-time entrance is to the north mezzanine, while the south mezzanine is open part-time. A number of comparatively narrow staircases and an elevator lead up to the mezzanine level. Brooklyn-bound trains use track K2 while uptown trains use track K3. These designations come from track chaining which measures track distances and are not used in normal conversation.

The connection to the Eighth Avenue Line platform contains the artwork Marine Grill Murals, salvaged from the Marine Grill restaurant in the Hotel McAlpin at Herald Square. The six murals in the station are part of a set of glazed terracotta mosaics created by Fred Dana Marsh in 1912 for the Marine Grill and were discarded in 1990 when the Marine Grill was demolished. Of the 16 original murals, 12 depicted two sets of six related scenes, while the other four depicted separate motifs. The New York Landmarks Conservancy preserved six of the murals, which were reinstalled at the Fulton Street station in 2001 for $200,000.

BMT Nassau Street Line platforms 

The Fulton Street station on the BMT Nassau Street Line has two tracks and two side platforms, with downtown trains on the upper level and uptown trains on the lower level. The J train stops here at all times, while the Z train stops here during rush hours in the peak direction. Because Nassau Street contains a curve at Fulton Street, the station had to be constructed on two levels.

The most direct entrances are on the left side of each platform, unlike in other stations. Northbound trains are more directly accessed via entrances on the west side of Nassau Street, and southbound trains are more directly accessed via entrances on the east side of Nassau Street. The IND platform passes underneath both levels of this station.

IRT Lexington Avenue Line platforms 

The Fulton Street station on the IRT Lexington Avenue Line has two tracks and two side platforms. It is situated underneath Broadway between Cortlandt and Fulton Streets. The 4 train stops here at all times, while the 5 train stops here at all times except late nights.

As with other stations built as part of the original IRT, the station was constructed using a cut-and-cover method. The tunnel is covered by a "U"-shaped trough that contains utility pipes and wires. Each platform consists of  concrete slabs, beneath which are drainage basins. The original platforms contain circular, cast-iron Doric-style columns away from the platform edge, spaced every , while the platform extensions contain I-beam columns near the platform edge. Additional columns between the tracks, spaced every , support the jack-arched concrete station roofs. There is a  gap between the trough wall and the platform walls, which are made of -thick brick covered over by a tiled finish.

There are fare control areas at platform level. The walls along the platforms near the fare control areas consist of a pink marble wainscoting on the lowest part of the wall, with bronze air vents along the wainscoting, and white glass tiles above. The platform walls are divided at  intervals by pink marble pilasters, or vertical bands. In the original portion of the station, each pilaster is topped by blue-and-green tile plaques, which contain the letter "F" surrounded by a buff-yellow and blue-green Greek key carving. Above these "F" plaques are faience mosaics that depict a mosaic of the Clermont, the steamboat built by Robert Fulton. These mosaics are topped by blue faience swags and are connected by a faience cornice with scrolled and foliate detail. This decorative design is extended to the fare control areas adjacent to the original portions of the station. White-on-blue tile plaques with the words "Fulton Street" and floral motifs are also placed on the walls. On the northern end of the southbound platform, there is a  granite wall separating it from the basement of 195 Broadway. Within the granite wall there are bronze sliding gates and a long window separated by bronze mullions. The sliding gates used to provide access to the station, a purpose that is now served by turnstiles.

IND Eighth Avenue Line platform 

The Fulton Street station (formerly the Broadway–Nassau Street station) on the IND Eighth Avenue Line has two tracks and one island platform. The A train stops here at all times, while the C train stops here at all times except late nights.

Similar to other stations near it, Fulton Street utilizes a tube station design because of its depth. The tile on this station is colored purple, with wall tiles reading "FULTON". An alternating pattern of "BWAY" and "NASSAU" was the original tiling.

The mezzanine is split in half by the BMT Nassau Street line directly above. Therefore, the IND platform is also used by passengers transferring between from IRT Lexington and northbound BMT Nassau trains to IRT Seventh Avenue and southbound BMT Nassau trains.

Prior to the Fulton Center project, the mezzanine contained an artwork by Nancy Holt, Astral Grating, which was installed in 1987 in conjunction with Lee Harris Pomeroy Architects. The artwork consisted of light fixtures on the ceiling, made of welded steel. The light fixtures signified five constellations, namely Aries, Auriga, Canis Major, Cygnus, and Piscis Austrinus.

Notable places nearby
St. Paul's Chapel
World Trade Center site
World Trade Center complex

References

Further reading

External links 

 
 
 
 
 nycsubway.org — Marine Grill Murals, 1913 Artwork by Fred Dana Marsh (2000)
 nycsubway.org — Astral Grating Artwork by Nancy Holt (1987)
 MTA's Arts For Transit — Fulton Street/William Street

BMT Nassau Street Line stations
Broadway (Manhattan)
Financial District, Manhattan
IND Eighth Avenue Line stations
IRT Broadway–Seventh Avenue Line stations
IRT Lexington Avenue Line stations
New York City Subway stations in Manhattan
New York City Subway transfer stations